Carl Locher (21 November 1851 – 20 December 1915) was a Danish realist painter who from an early age became a member of the Skagen group of painters.

Biography
Carl Ludvig Thilson Locher was born in Flensburg in the Duchy of Schleswig which was then part of Denmark. From an early age he took an interest in ships and received his first training from his father who painted ship portraits for a living. After the father died, he continued his business for a short while and went on several voyages with ships of the Royal Danish Navy. Struck by the grandeur of the Atlantic Ocean, a voyage to the Danish West Indies made a particular impression on him.

Even before he began his studies at the Royal Danish Academy of Art in 1872, he was encouraged by Holger Drachmann to spend a couple of months in Skagen, the artists colony in the far north of Jutland. He quickly completed paintings of the beach, some with fishing boats or wrecks. He also became interested in the horse-drawn carriage which travelled along the beach on its journey from Frederikshavn.
In the 1870s, Locher continued his studies in Paris where he trained at the studio of Léon Bonnat 1875-76, 1878-79.
He visited Skagen whenever he was back in Denmark. Ultimately he had a house built there where he lived until his death.

As an etcher Locher was regarded among the best and most productive of the Danish artists; From 1885 he made a number of smaller and larger prints, with a lot of picturesque energy. In 1892, he devoted most of his time to the art of etching, and travelled - with support from the Danish state - to Berlin, where he became a student of the excellent copper etching artist professor Hans Meyer (1846-1910) at the Berlin University of the Arts (Hochschule der Künste Berlin). A complete collection of his prints can be found at Skagens Museum.

Supported by the State, he opened an etching school for Danish artists in Copenhagen, where he taught until 1900. Skagen painters such as Anna Ancher and Michael Ancher and P.S. Krøyer attended the school.

Selected paintings

See also
Skagen Painters

References

Literature

External links 

Danish marine artists
1851 births
1915 deaths
Modern painters
19th-century Danish painters
Danish male painters
20th-century Danish painters
Skagen Painters
Royal Danish Academy of Fine Arts alumni
Recipients of the Eckersberg Medal
19th-century Danish male artists
20th-century Danish male artists